Epsilon Nu Tau is a professional co-educational college fraternity for students interested in Entrepreneurship.

History
Epsilon Nu Tau was founded on April 18, 2008 at University of Dayton. Epsilon Nu Tau joined the Professional Fraternity Association in 2015.

Chapters
The chapters of Epsilon Nu Tau:
Alpha Chapter at University of Dayton - April 18, 2008
Beta Chapter at Texas State University -
Gamma Chapter at California State University Fullerton -
Delta Chapter at Seton Hall University -
Epsilon Chapter at Ohio University -
Zeta Chapter at Ohio State University -
Eta Chapter at Central Michigan University -
Theta Chapter at Purdue University -
Iota Chapter at University of Michigan - April 29, 2013
Kappa Chapter at James Madison University - April 11, 2016
Nu Chapter at DePaul University - January 16, 2017
Pi Chapter at University of Alabama at Birmingham -
Upsilon Chapter at Indiana University Bloomington - January 2021

National Conferences
2nd - Texas State University - November 18–19, 2011
3rd - California State University Fullerton - April 19–21, 2013
4th - Seton Hall University - April 11–13, 2014
5th - Central Michigan University - April 10–12, 2015
6th - Purdue University - April 21–24, 2016

See also

 Professional fraternities and sororities

References

Student organizations established in 2008
Professional fraternities and sororities in the United States
Professional Fraternity Association
2008 establishments in Ohio